Pobeda is a rural locality (a village) in Tabynsky Selsoviet, Gafuriysky District, Bashkortostan, Russia. The population was 4 as of 2010. There is 1 street.

Geography 
Pobeda is located 25 km north of Krasnousolsky (the district's administrative centre) by road. Geroyevka is the nearest rural locality.

References 

Rural localities in Gafuriysky District